The Zi River (资水) in Hunan, China, flows into the Yangtze River via Lake Dongting.

References

External links

Rivers of Hunan
Tributaries of the Yangtze River